Sweet Adeline is a 1926 American silent comedy film directed by Jerome Storm and starring Charles Ray and Gertrude Olmstead.

Plot
As described in a film magazine review, Ben Wilson is the household drudge, bullied by his older brother Bill, with his only consolation being the owner of a fine tenor voice. He falls in love with Adeline, newly arrived to their rural village. Bill ends up being his rival for her affection. Ben makes a local hit singing "Sweet Adeline," and Bill procures a chance for him to sing in a Chicago cabaret. At first he breaks down, but recovers and rallies himself and is warmly received. His dream of success comes true and he wins the affection of Adeline.

Cast
 Charles Ray as Ben Wilson 
 Gertrude Olmstead as Adeline 
 Jack Rube Clifford as Bill Wilson 
 J.P. Lockney as Pa Wilson
 Sabel Johnson as Fat Lady 
 Gertrude Short as Cabaret Dancer 
 Ida Lewis as Ma Wilson 
 Lillian Leighton as Adeline's Ma

References

Bibliography
 Munden, Kenneth White. The American Film Institute Catalog of Motion Pictures Produced in the United States, Part 1. University of California Press, 1997.

External links
 
 
 
 

1926 films
1926 comedy films
Silent American comedy films
Films directed by Jerome Storm
American silent feature films
1920s English-language films
American black-and-white films
1920s American films